The 1988–89 Kansas Jayhawks men's basketball team represented the University of Kansas in the 1988–89 NCAA Division I men's basketball season, which was the Jayhawks' 91st basketball season. The head coach was Roy Williams, who served his 1st year at KU. The team played its home games in Allen Fieldhouse in Lawrence, Kansas. The season remains, as of the 2022 tournament, the most recent tournament Kansas failed to qualify for, due to an NCAA-imposed postseason ban imposed on KU for recruiting violations committed by former coach Larry Brown. It also remains, as of the 2021–22 season the last time Kansas failed to win 20 games.

Roster

Big Eight Conference standings

Schedule 

|-

|-

|-
!colspan=9| Big Eight Tournament

Rankings 

*There was no coaches poll in week 1.

See also 
 1989 NCAA Men's Division I Basketball Tournament

References 

Kansas Jayhawks men's basketball seasons
Kansas
Kansas Jay
Kansas Jay